Lieutenant Milton Aronowitz was an American college football head coach who was Delaware football program's ninth head coach. He led them to a 1–2–2 overall record in 1918—his only season.

Head coaching record

References

Year of birth missing
Year of death missing
Delaware Fightin' Blue Hens football coaches